Sergey Samsonenko (born 17 November 1967) is a Russian millionaire and businessman residing in the Republic of North Macedonia. He is the owner of the Macedonian football club FK Vardar and the Macedonian handball club RK Vardar.

He is also the owner of Betcity, the largest sports-betting company in Russia and, the first Russian company to enter top 500 most prominent companies.

References

Russian businesspeople
Russian people of Ukrainian descent
1967 births
Living people

Russian expatriates in North Macedonia
Gambling people
Sports betting